Consensus democracy, consensus politics or consensualism is the application of consensus decision-making to the process of legislation in a democracy. It is characterized by a decision-making structure that involves and takes into account as broad a range of opinions as possible, as opposed to systems where minority opinions can potentially be ignored by vote-winning majorities. The latter systems are classified as majoritarian democracy.

Consensus democracy also features increased citizen participation both in determining the political agenda and in the decision-making process itself. Some have pointed to developments in information and communication technology as potential facilitators of such systems.

A consensus government is one in which the cabinet is appointed by the legislature without reference to political parties. It is generally found as part of a consensus or non-partisan democracy.

Examples
 
Consensus democracy is most closely embodied in certain countries such as Switzerland, Germany, Denmark, Lebanon, Sweden, Iraq, and Belgium, where consensus is an important feature of political culture, particularly with a view to preventing the domination of one linguistic or cultural group in the political process. The term consociational state is used in political science to describe countries with such consensus based political systems. An example of such a system could be the Dutch Poldermodel.
Many parties in Lebanon call for applying consensus democracy, especially at times of crisis.

Consensus government chiefly arises in non-partisan democracies and similar systems in which a majority of politicians are independent. Many former British territories with large indigenous populations use consensus government to fuse traditional tribal leadership with the Westminster system. Consensus government in Canada is used in the Northwest Territories and Nunavut, as well as the autonomous Nunatsiavut region, and similar systems have arisen in the Pacific island nations of Fiji, Tuvalu and Vanuatu, as well as the ancient Tynwald of the Isle of Man and the sui generis Council of the Isles of Scilly.

Canada

In Canada, the territorial governments of the Northwest Territories and Nunavut operate on a consensus model, unlike the oppositional political party structure that prevails elsewhere in Canada.

European parliament 
The European parliament does not form any government coalition, instead a consociationalism system with fluid coalitions exists, which changes from year to year.

Guernsey
Consensus (non-party) government operates in Guernsey in the Channel Islands. Guernsey also operates a non-ministerial system of government in which government departments are headed not by ministers with executive authority, but by committees of five members. Members of the committees are elected by the 40-member States of Deliberation, which is both the parliament and the executive. The States of Guernsey (the island's parliament) last endorsed the system of consensus government by committees in 2002, when it rejected, by a very significant majority, a proposition to replace the system with executive/cabinet-style government. In 2004 Guernsey last made changes to its system of government.

All major items of policy are proposed to the Assembly, by which they are approved, amended or rejected. Most items are determined by simple majority voting. 

At the most recent general election of people's deputies (members), all candidates campaigned as independents without affiliation with any party. Political parties have existed from time to time, but with little success.

In 2009, a majority of members of Guernsey's parliament signed a letter describing their continuing commitment to consensus government by committees and opposition to executive/cabinet-style government.

At their meeting on 16 July 2009, the States of Deliberation resolved to establish a Tribunal by the Tribunals of Inquiry (Evidence)(Guernsey) Law, 1949, as amended to inquire into the facts and circumstances of the industrial action by the Airport Fire Fighters at Guernsey Airport during May 2009, including the circumstances in which the dispute was resolved.  The Resolution followed presentation of a Requête dated 29 June 2009 petitioning for a Tribunal of Inquiry to be established, signed by Deputy M M Lowe and seventeen other members of the States soon after the events being investigated.

The Tribunal of Inquiry's Report was published on 23 April 2010 and included the following text:
The failure to deal with the underlying problem, which led to the industrial
action '''by the firefighters, stems from the system of government which does not encourage either a corporate approach or collective responsibility. In our view there was a systemic failure to act in a corporate and strategic manner.

During debate on the findings of the Tribunal, it was confirmed that the Tribunal's statements in respect of corporate and strategic planning related only to the topic of industrial relations and were not a more general commentary about the island's system of government.

In 2010 the island's parliament indicated its continuing endorsement of government by committees and consensus when it approved by a large majority a motion which proposed that governance arrangements should be improved strictly within the existing system of government.

Immediately after the 2012 general election, the States of Deliberation elected a States Review Committee to review the extent to which the legislature and the executive are capable of fulfilling expectations of good governance with particular reference to policy development, accountability, and policy co-ordination and to make recommendations for any reforms considered necessary. The States Review Committee is due to report to the States of Deliberation in two stages before the end of 2014.

See also
Anticipatory democracy
Bioregional democracy
Coalition government
Confessionalism (politics)
Consensus decision-making
Consensus voting – the modified Borda count (MBC)
Consociationalism
Deliberative democracy
Demarchy
Democracy (varieties)
Direct democracy
Grassroots democracy
Hung parliament
List of politics-related topics
Majoritarian democracy
Majority government
Minority government
Minoritarianism
One party state
Open source governance
Rationality and Power
Sociocracy
Supermajority

References

External links
Consensus Democracy: A New Approach to 21st Century Governance
Metagovernment - Project using the wiki consensus model as a replacement for current governments.
On Conflict and Consensus - A Handbook on Formal Consensus Decisionmaking.
 Consensus voting, the Modified Borda Count (MBC)

Comparative politics
Government of Guernsey
Participatory democracy
Types of democracy
Power sharing